The Al Jaghbub Oasis is a protected area in northeastern Libya lying close to the border with Egypt. It adjoins the desert village of Jaghbub which is inhabited by Berbers with a population of about 400.

Geography
To the north of the oasis are escarpments where the Al Jaghbub Formation dating to the Middle Miocene is exposed. Fossils of echinoderms, bivalve molluscs, gastropods and bryozoans are found in this formation.

History
The Al Jaghbub Oasis was an important staging post for trans-Saharan traders and for pilgrims going to Siwa, Cairo and on to Mecca. In 1856, Muhammad ibn Ali as-Senussi moved the headquarters of the Senussi movement from Bayda to here. Al Jaghbub became a fortress town with an important Islamic university, second only in prestige to the Al-Azhar University in Cairo.

The oasis
The protected area was set up to provide a habitat in which the native wild animals and plants of the area could flourish. The governmental body overseeing the protected area is the Technical Committee of Wildlife and National Parks which was created in 1990.

The oasis is visited by birds, especially waterfowl, during their annual migrations. It is of particular interest because of the presence here of a subspecies of cockle Cardium edule rectidens, a marine bivalve mollusc.

References

Protected areas of Libya
Oases of Libya